Catalpa, commonly called catalpa or catawba, is a genus of flowering plants in the family Bignoniaceae, native to warm temperate and subtropical regions of North America, the Caribbean, and East Asia.

Description
They have characteristic large, heart-shaped leaves, which in some species are three-lobed. The appearance of the leaves sometimes causes confusion with species such as the unrelated tung tree (Vernicia fordii) and Paulownia tomentosa. Catalpa species bear broad panicles of showy flowers, generally in summer. The flower colour generally is white to yellow.

The large leaves and dense foliage of Catalpa species provide good shelter from rain and wind, making the trees an attractive habitat for many species of birds. They do not present many threats of falling limbs, but the dark-brown fruit husks that they drop in late summer may be a nuisance.

Though Catalpa wood is quite soft, it is popular for turning and for furniture when well seasoned, being attractive, stable and easy to work.

Most catalpas begin flowering after roughly three years, and produce fruit after about five years, although Haitian catalpa (Catalpa longissima) can flower after six months growth from seed and produce seed after 18 months.

Species

The two North American species, Catalpa bignonioides (southern catalpa) and Catalpa speciosa (northern catalpa), have been widely planted outside their natural ranges as ornamental trees for their showy flowers and attractive shape. Northern and southern catalpas are very similar in appearance, but the northern species has slightly larger leaves, flowers, and bean pods. Flowering starts after 275 growing degree days. Catalpa ovata from China, with pale yellow flowers, is also planted outside its natural range for ornamental purposes. This allowed C. bignonioides and C. ovata to hybridize, with the resultant Catalpa × erubescens also becoming a cultivated ornamental.

List of selected species 
Sources: (GRIN accepts 8 species) (KEW accepts 8 species)

 Catalpa bignonioides  – southern catalpa
 Catalpa brevipes 
 Catalpa bungei  – Manchurian catalpa
 Catalpa cassinoides  
 Catalpa communis 
 Catalpa cordifolia 
 Catalpa denticulata 
 Catalpa domingensis 
 Catalpa duclouxii 
 Catalpa ekmaniana 
 Catalpa fargesii 
 Catalpa henryi 
 Catalpa heterophylla 
 Catalpa himalayensis 
 Catalpa hirsuta 
 Catalpa kaempferi 
 Catalpa longisiliqua 
 Catalpa longissima  – Haitian catalpa
 Catalpa macrocarpa 
 Catalpa microphylla 
 Catalpa nana 
 Catalpa oblongata 
 Catalpa obovata 
 Catalpa ovata  – Chinese catalpa, yellow catalpa
 Catalpa pottsii 
 Catalpa pubescens 
 Catalpa pumila 
 Catalpa punctata 
 Catalpa purpurea 
 Catalpa silvestrii 
 Catalpa speciosa  – northern catalpa
 Catalpa sutchuensis 
 Catalpa ternifolia 
 Catalpa thunbergii 
 Catalpa tibetica 
 Catalpa umbraculifera 
 Catalpa vestita 
 Catalpa wallichiana

Etymology
The name derives from the Muscogee name for the tree, "kutuhlpa" meaning "winged head" and is unrelated to the name of the Catawba people. The spellings "Catalpa" and "Catalpah" were used by Mark Catesby between 1729 and 1732, and Carl Linnaeus published the tree's name as Bignonia catalpa in 1753. Giovanni Antonio Scopoli established the genus Catalpa in 1777.

The bean-like seed pod is the origin of the alternative vernacular names Indian bean tree and cigar tree for Catalpa bignonioides and Catalpa speciosa, respectively.

Food source
The tree is the sole source of food for the catalpa sphinx moth (Ceratomia catalpae), the leaves being eaten by the caterpillars. When caterpillars are numerous, infested trees may be completely defoliated.   Defoliated catalpas produce new leaves readily, but with multiple generations occurring, new foliage may be consumed by subsequent broods. Severe defoliation over several consecutive years can cause death of trees. Because the caterpillars are an excellent live bait for fishing, some dedicated anglers plant catalpa mini-orchards for their own private source of "catawba-worms", particularly in the southern states.

Other uses
Catalpa is also occasionally used as a tonewood in guitars.

References

External links 

Catalpa speciosa images at bioimages.vanderbilt.edu

 
Bignoniaceae genera